Edmonton International Raceway is a , paved oval auto racing facility, located outside Wetaskiwin, Alberta, Canada, approximately  south of Edmonton. The track is the first in Alberta to be sanctioned by NASCAR, and hosts races in the NASCAR Advance Auto Parts Weekly Series. It hosted its first NASCAR Pinty's Series race in 2014.

Edmonton Int'l Raceway hosts the only race car experience on a NASCAR Track in Western Canada. 

The CASCAR West Series ran five races at the track between 2002 and 2006.

References

External links

Edmonton International Raceway race results at Racing-Reference

Paved oval racing venues in Canada
Motorsport venues in Alberta
County of Wetaskiwin No. 10
Motorsport venues in Canada
NASCAR tracks
CASCAR